Clara Fanny Olivier (February 17, 1875,  4th arrondissement of Paris – February 24, 1944), known by her pen name Fanny Clar, was a French journalist and writer, as well as a socialist intellectual (as defined by the French Section of the Workers' International (SFIO). She is also remembered for her commitment to pacifism and feminism. While her literary work includes novels, poems and plays, Clar primarily wrote stories for children.

Early life
Clara Fanny Olivier was born in Paris, February 17, 1875. She was the daughter of two opticians living on Avenue Victoria.

Career
In 1904, Clar contributed to Le Libertaire as "Francine". There she met Miguel Almereyda, the father of Jean Vigo, with whom she maintained contact.

Beginning on August 21, 1912, and every week thereafter, in the antimilitarist newspaper  she wrote a column for women titled "" (Our corner). In November 1913, she worked with Miguel Almereyda at the newspaper Le Bonnet rouge. Her sentimental serial novel,  (The Rose of Jericho) appeared in L'Humanité from October 6, 1916.

Clar wrote articles for the feminist newspaper La Voix des femmes (founded in 1917 by Colette Reynaud and Louise Bodin) when it was relaunched in October 1919. In 1920, she was accused of defeatism and demoralization by Louis Marchand in his book  for her writings of 1915 (1 June 1915, 2 June 1915, 10 June 1915, 13 August 1915, 8 December 1915, and others).

In addition to numerous articles in various newspapers and magazines, Clar wrote novels, poems and plays. She was admitted to the Société des gens de lettres in 1924. In 1932, her articles appeared in Le Soir (arts section), L’Ère nouvelle (women’s section), Vu, and L’Âge heureux.

Jean Vigo hired Clar for the role of Juliette's mother (uncredited) in the film L'Atalante in 1934, and she went on to promote the movie.

Personal life
Clar married Émile Célié. They had a son, Jean (born February 21, 1897), and lived at 70 rue des Batignolles. She later lived with the sculptor and painter Raphaël Diligent (1884-1964) who illustrated several of her books.

Fanny Clar died on February 24, 1944.

Her grandson, François Clar (1931-2011), was a painter.

Selected works

 Céline petite bourgeoise, 1919.
 Les Jacques, 1926.
 Les trois souhaits de Babette, Éditions de la jeunesse. Monthly publications. January 1928, no. 4, editor l'École émancipée.
 La Ronde de la maison, current reading book for the preparatory course (1st year), for infant classes and nursery schools, Éditions Montaigne, 1928.
 Vitivit et sa nichée: histoire d'une famille de pinsons with Lucien Descaves, Éditions de la Rose Rouge, 1931.
 La Colombe blessée, 1932.
 L'enfant sans larmes, Éditions Administration 39-41, Passage Choiseul, 1932.
 L'Appel de l'homme de l'usine, du chantier, manifeste with Cresson, Diligent, and Flament, 1932.
 Sans rimes... non sans raisons, Éditions de la Rose rouge, 1935. (booklet of poems)
 L'île aux épouvantails, Éditions E.S.I., 24, rue Racine, 1935.
 Nous allons jouer, Children's Theater dedicated to adults. Drawing by R. Diligent, impr. Joe. Vermault, 1935.
 Dix-sept et un, illustrations by Diligent, 1938.
 Le jardin des mille soucis, 1939 (poems).
 Les Mains enchantées, illustrations by Diligent and Jean Clar, Éditions de l'Ecureuil, 1924, 1939,1946, 1959.
 La Maison des sept compagnons avec Albert Bernet, 1947.

Notes

References

Sources
 Birnbaum, Paula J., Women Artists in Interwar France: Framing Femininities, Farnham, Ashgate Press, 2011.
 Cooper, Clarissa Burnham, Women poets of the twentieth century in France, King's Crown Press, 1943.
 Embs, Jean-Marie; Mellot, Philippe; Carcopino, Jean-Jérôme (photographer), Le siècle d'or du livre d'enfants et de jeunesse: 1840-1940, Paris, éditions de l'Amateur, 2000. (in French)
 Gomes, P. E. S., Jean Vigo, Paris, Seuil, 1957 (édition consultée : Ramsay, 1988). (in French)
 Icher, François, Les compagnonnages en France au XXe siècle : histoire, mémoire, représentations, éditions Grancher, 1999. (in French)
 Legendre, Tony, Expériences de vie communautaire anarchiste en France : La Clairière de Vaux, Aisne, 1902-1907 et la colonie naturiste et végétalienne de Bascon, Aisne, 1911-1951, Saint-Georges-d'Oléron, Les éditions libertaires, 2006. (in French)
 MacLeod, Catriona; Plesch, Véronique; Schoell-Glass, Charlotte, Elective Affinities : Testing Word and Image Relationships, Amsterdam, Rodopi, 2009.
 Bianco, René, 100 ans de presse anarchiste : notice. (in French)

1875 births
1944 deaths
Writers from Paris
20th-century French journalists
20th-century French novelists
20th-century French poets
French children's writers
20th-century French dramatists and playwrights
French women journalists
French women novelists
French women poets
French women children's writers
French women dramatists and playwrights
Anarcho-pacifists
Pacifist feminists
French anarchists
Anarchism and education
20th-century pseudonymous writers
Pseudonymous women writers